Constantin Rădulescu may refer to:
Constantin Rădulescu-Motru ("Motru", 1868–1957), Romanian academic and politician
Constantin Rădulescu (footballer, born 1896) ("Costel", 1896–1981), Romanian goalkeeper, football manager and bobsledder
Constantin Rădulescu (footballer, born 1924) ("Jumate", 1924–2001), Romanian midfielder and football manager